Boris Nikolayevich Kuzyk (in ; born October 19, 1958, Oleksandrivka Raion, Kirovohrad Oblast, Soviet Union) is a Russian economist, PhD in economics, professor, member of Russian Academy of Sciences, Honored Scientist of the Russian Federation, director of the Institute for Economic Strategies, Major general.

Biography 
In 1979, he graduated with honors from the Yaroslavl Higher Military Financial School. In 1987, also with honors, he graduated from Military Faculty of the Moscow Financial Institute. After graduation he served in the military units of the Far Eastern Military District.

From 1987 to 1993, he worked at the USSR and Russia's Ministry of Foreign Economic Relations. From 1994 to 1998 he served as assistant to President of Russia for military-technical cooperation between Russia and foreign countries.

Since May 22, 2003 he has been corresponding member, and since December 22, 2011 – full member of the Russian Academy of Sciences (Department of Social Sciences: economics of socio-economic transformations).

Scientific activity 
The scientific interests of Boris Kuzyk are related to Innovation economics issues. He studied the features of the formation of innovation system of modern Russia, developed a set of proposals for the development and restructuring of the high-tech industry, ensuring Russia's economic security, supporting science-intensive industries, and a long-term strategy for Russia's socio-economic development. He proposed a comprehensive system of measures in the field of economic support of the national program “Hydrogen energy in Russia”.

Boris Kuzyk is the author of more than 200 scientific papers (including 26 monographs).

Recognition 
 State Prize of the Russian Federation
 Honored Scientist of the Russian Federation (2000)
 Gold N. D. Kondratieff Medal (2004)

Selected scientific works 
 Russia – 2050: innovation breakthrough strategy. M.: Economica publishing house, 2004.
 Economics of the military sphere. M.: Znanie publishing house, 2006, 224 p.
 Civilizations: theory, history, dialogue, future. M.: Institute of Economic Strategies, 2006, in 2 volumes.
 China – Russia 2050: co-development strategy. M.: Institute of Economic Strategies, 2006.
 India – Russia: Partnership Strategy in the 21st century. M.: Institute of Economic Strategies, 2009. 1224 p. .

References

1958 births
Living people
1st class Active State Councillors of the Russian Federation
Full Members of the Russian Academy of Sciences
Honoured Scientists of the Russian Federation
State Prize of the Russian Federation laureates
Russian major generals
N. D. Kondratieff Medal laureates
Russian economists
Financial University under the Government of the Russian Federation alumni
People from Kirovohrad Oblast